Tricypha nigrescens is a moth of the subfamily Arctiinae first described by Rothschild in 1909. It is found in French Guiana, Brazil and Paraguay.

References

Moths described in 1909
Phaegopterina
Moths of South America